FROB, the Spanish Executive Resolution Authority (formerly known as Fund for Orderly Bank Restructuring) is an entity of the Spanish government that manages the resolution processes of credit institutions and investment firms in their executive phase in Spain. 

FROB was created in 2009 as a result of the financial crisis. Initially, its aim was to increase the strength and solvency of the Spanish banking system by means of two essential functions at that time: managing the restructuring processes of credit institutions and helping to strengthen their own funds.

Today, and since the approval of Law 11/2015, FROB is the Spanish Executive Resolution Authority, financed exclusively with private contributions from banks and which is integrated into the European network of authorities led by the Single Resolution Board (SRB).

Law 11/2015 set up a new institutional framework in order to comply with the principles set out in Resolution Directive 2014/59/EU to separate supervisory and resolution functions and led to a transformation in the organisational structure, governance and functions of FROB. 

From an operational perspective, in this new stage, FROB continues to be responsible for completion of the restructuring process in progress, which nowadays basically includes monitoring the holdings in BFA-Bankia  and Sareb, as well as the guarantees granted in previous sale processes. However, this activity coexists with its new functions as executive resolution authority within the European SRM and cooperating with other Spanish preventive authorities (Bank of Spain and the National Securities Market Commission, CNMV), within Spain’s institutional framework.

The SRM  is a centralised resolution system made up of the national resolution authorities and a single authority - the Single Resolution Board (SRB) - the European agency to which many of the powers of the Member States in matters of resolution were transferred. These authorities are joined by the European Central Bank (ECB), the European Commission and the Council in the terms established in the SRM Regulation. Similarly, the SRM has a Single Resolution Fund (SRF)  that is raised and managed by the SRB with contributions from all the entities of the Banking Union to be used in the case of resolution.

References

External links
 Official website
 Corporate presentation
 Report “10 years of FROB. A decade for financial stability” 
 Single Resolution Board 
 BFA Tenedora de acciones SAU
 Sareb
 Single Resolution Mechanism
 Single Resolution Fund
 Report on the Financial and Banking Crisis in Spain, 2008-2014, Bank of Spain.
 Bank recovery and Resolution, European Commission.

Banking in Spain
Government of Spain
2009 establishments in Spain